Claude Le Pen (17 February 1948 – 6 April 2020) was a French economist. He specialized in health economics.

Biography
Le Pen earned a doctorate in economics in 1980. He was a professor first at University of Rennes from 1981 to 1984, then at the Paris Dauphine University.

A graduate of HEC Paris, Le Pen held a doctorate in the history and epidemiology of economic thought and a doctorate of economics. He was an associate of the Faculté des sciences économiques.

Claude Le Pen died on 6 April 2020 at the age of 72 following a long illness.

References

1948 births
2020 deaths
Place of birth missing
Academic staff of the University of Rennes
HEC Paris alumni
20th-century  French economists
21st-century  French  economists
Deaths from cancer in France